South Carolina Highway 768 (SC 768) is a  primary state highway in the U.S. state of South Carolina. It serves to connect businesses along Shop Road to nearby state highways.

Route description

SC 768 is an urban highway that zig-zags from SC 48 to U.S. Route 76 (US 76) and 378. The main stretch is Shop Road, where it is a four-lane divided highway and has an interchange with Interstate 77 (I-77); while Beltline Boulevard and Pineview Road are a two-lane with a median.

History

The first SC 768 appeared from 1942-1948 as a spur off US 76, from Marion  to Pitch Pot Swamp.  It was downgraded to secondary status.

The current SC 768 was established between 1980–82, as a new primary routing; which has changed little since.

Major intersections

Columbia connector route

South Carolina Highway 768 Connector (SC 768 Conn.) is a connector route of SC 768 between the mainline (Shop Road / Pineview Road) and Longwood Road, south-southeast of Columbia. It is known as Shop Road Extension and is an unsigned highway.

See also

References

External links

SC 768 at Virginia Highways' South Carolina Highways Annex

768
Transportation in Richland County, South Carolina
Transportation in Columbia, South Carolina